Sesac may refer to:

 Shishaq, an Egyptian pharaoh
 SESAC, a performing-rights organization